Lemniscia galeata is a species of air-breathing land snails, terrestrial pulmonate gastropod mollusks in the family Geomitridae, the hairy snails and their allies.

This species is endemic to Madeira, Portugal.

References

External links
 Cameron, Robert A. D., Teixeira, Dinarte, Pokryszko, Beata, Silva, Isamberto and Groh, Klaus. (2021). An annotated checklist of the extant and Quaternary land molluscs of the Desertas Islands, Madeiran Archipelago. Journal of Conchology 44(1): 53-70

Endemic fauna of Madeira
Molluscs of Europe
Lemniscia
Gastropods described in 1862
Taxonomy articles created by Polbot